Vadakkukottai is a village in the Orathanadu taluk of Thanjavur district, Tamil Nadu, India.

Demographics 

As per the 2001 census, Vadakkukottai had a total population of 1006 with 510 males and 496 females. The sex ratio was 973. The literacy rate was 72.09.

References 

 

Villages in Thanjavur district